The WPA 10-Ball World Championship 2009 was the second edition of the WPA World 10-ball Championship, the world championship for the discipline of 10-ball pool. The event took place from November 25 to 30, 2009. The qualification phase was hosted at the Star Billiards Center, in Quezon City while the final tournament which started from May 10, 2011, was hosted at the World Trade Center Manila in Pasay.

The event was won by Finland's Mika Immonen, defeating Filipino Lee Van Corteza in the final 11–6. British Darren Appleton was the defending champion, having won the 2008 event, but was defeated by David Alcaide in the quarter-finals.

Format
The 128 participating players were divided into 16 groups, in which they competed in a double elimination tournament against each other. The remaining 64 players in each group qualified for the final round played in the knockout system.

Prize money
Below was the advertised prize fund for the event.

Knockout round

References

External links
 WPA World 10-Ball Championship 2009 at azbilliards.com

2009
WPA World Ten-ball Championship
WPA World Ten-ball Championship
International sports competitions hosted by the Philippines